John Rädecker (5 December 1885, Amsterdam – 12 January 1956, Amsterdam) was a painter and sculptor from the northern Netherlands, best known for his National Monument on the Dam.

Biography
According to the RKD he was a pupil of Bart van Hove and a member of various painting societies such as the Hollandse Aquarellisten Kring and the Haarlem-based De Groep, as well as being a sculptor. The Teylers Museum has a portrait of his daughter by his hand on show in their "Modern", or "Second" art gallery.  He designed the National Monument and asked Adriaan Roland Holst to write the poem at the base. When he died, the monument was finished by his sons Han and Jan Willem.

Public collections
Among the public collections holding works by John Rädecker are:
 Museum de Fundatie, Zwolle, The Netherlands
 Teylers Museum

References

1885 births
1956 deaths
Dutch male sculptors
Painters from Amsterdam
20th-century Dutch painters
Dutch male painters
20th-century Dutch sculptors
20th-century Dutch male artists